William Ambrosia Cowley was a 17th-century English buccaneer who surveyed the Galápagos Islands during his circumnavigation of the world while serving under several Captains such as John Eaton, John Cook, and later Edward Davis. Cowley published the first chart of the islands in 1684.  In his diary he reported the discovery of the mythical Pepys Island, allegedly situated north of the Falkland Islands, prompting a number of mariners to look in vain for the nonexistent land.

References
William Ambrosia Cowley. Cowley's Voyage Round the Globe, in Collection of Original Voyages, ed. William Hacke.  London: James Knapton, 1699. https://web.archive.org/web/20180120160933/http://www.galapagos.to/TEXTS/COWLEY.HTM
1686 “A Short Account of My Voyage Round this Terestiall Globe of the World from Virginia to England and through the Great South Sea.” In Miscellanea Curiosa. Richmond, Virginia: Virginia Historical Society Mss1. T8525a3, Vol IV (letter written by Cowley describing his voyage). https://web.archive.org/web/20181024234711/http://www.galapagos.to/TEXTS/TURNERMS.HTM
1687 “The Voyage of Capt. Cowley. Papist.” In Lambeth Ms. 642: Codex Chartaceus. London: Lambeth Palace Library https://web.archive.org/web/20181024234711/http://www.galapagos.to/TEXTS/LAMBETH.HTM
1688 Cowley's Voyage Round the World. London: British Library. Sloane MS. 1050. https://web.archive.org/web/20181024234711/http://www.galapagos.to/TEXTS/COWLEY-MS.HTM
1698 “A Journal kept by Capt. Wm. Cowley on board the Ship Nicholas of London Capt. John Eaton Commander. A Voyage from Gorgona Island … to … Holland.”  https://web.archive.org/web/20170219001609/http://www.galapagos.to/TEXTS/COWLEY-1.HTM#Morgan
 and “An abstract of a journal kept by Capt. Cowley from Cape Charles … to … the Island of Gorgona.” In William Hacke, Handwritten Journal of Pirate Bartholomew Sharpe. New York: Morgan Library. Ms. MA 3310. https://web.archive.org/web/20170219001609/http://www.galapagos.to/TEXTS/COWLEY-1.HTM#Morgan
William Dampier. A New Voyage Round the World. 1697.

English pirates
17th-century English people
Year of birth unknown
Year of death unknown